The canton of Montluçon-Sud is a former administrative division in central France. It was disbanded following the French canton reorganisation which came into effect in March 2015. It had 15,789 inhabitants (2012).

The canton comprised the following communes:
Lavault-Sainte-Anne
Lignerolles
Montluçon (partly)
Néris-les-Bains
Teillet-Argenty

Demographics

See also
Cantons of the Allier department 
Communes of France

References

Former cantons of Allier
2015 disestablishments in France
States and territories disestablished in 2015